Sabine Hall is the name of multiple notable buildings, including:

 Sabine Hall (Garden City, Kansas)
 Sabine Hall (Warsaw, Virginia)

See also
 Sabine Hill, house in Elizabethton, Tennessee

Architectural disambiguation pages